This article presents a list of the historical events and publications of Australian literature during 1993.

Events 

 Alex Miller (writer) won the Miles Franklin Award for The Ancestor Game

Major publications

Novels 

 Bryce Courtenay, April Fool's Day (novel)
 Rodney Hall (writer), The Grisly Wife
 Dorothy Hewett, The Toucher
 David Malouf, Remembering Babylon
 Roger McDonald, Water Man (novel)
 Frank Moorhouse, Grand Days
 Madeleine St John, The Women in Black

Children's and young adult fiction 

 Isobelle Carmody, The Gathering
 Carmel Charles, Winin: Why the Emu Cannot Fly
 Morris Gleitzman, Sticky Beak
 John Marsden (writer), Tomorrow, When the War Began
 Dorothy Porter, The Witch Number

Poetry 

 Robert Gray (poet), Certain Things
 Barry Hill (Australian writer), Ghosting William Buckley
 Philip Hodgins, The End of the Season
 Jill Jones (poet), Flagging Down Time
 Jennifer Maiden, Acoustic Shadow
 Jan Owen, Blackberry Season
 John Tranter, At the Florida

Drama 

 Louis Nowra, Radiance

Non-fiction 

 Verity Burgmann, Power and Protest: Movements for Change in Australian Society
 Hazel Rowley, Christina Stead: A Biography
 Peter Singer, How Are We to Live?

Deaths 
A list, ordered by date of death (and, if the date is either unspecified or repeated, ordered alphabetically by surname) of deaths in 1993 of Australian literary figures, authors of written works or literature-related individuals follows, including year of birth.

 9 January — Paul Hasluck, statesman, poet, biographer and writer on politics (born 1905)
 19 January — Nancy Keesing, poet, writer, editor and promoter of Australian literature (born 1923)
 4 February — Leonard Frank Meares, writer of western fiction (born 1921)
 1 March — Ronald McCuaig, poet, journalist, literary critic, humourist and children's author (born 1908)
 23 March — Robert Harris (poet), poet (born 1951)
 1 April — Kevin Gilbert (author), author, activist, artist, poet, playwright and printmaker (born 1933)
 1 July – Eric Irvin, historian and poet (born 1908)
 25 August — Florence James, author and literary agent (born 1902)
 16 September — Oodgeroo Noonuccal, poet, political activist, artist and educator (born 1920)

See also 

 1993 in Australia
 1993 in literature
 1993 in poetry
 List of years in literature
 List of years in Australian literature

References 

1993 in Australia
Australian literature by year
20th-century Australian literature
1993 in literature